Hugh William Macpherson Dulley (11 July 1903 – 19 December 1941), known as Peter Dulley, was a British rower. He competed in the men's eight event at the 1924 Summer Olympics. He was killed in World War II.

Personal life
Dulley was the son of Herbert Dulley and was a member of at the Thames Rowing Club and attended Westminster School. He started at Westminster as a King's Scholar in 1917  He moved to Hong Kong where he joined the Royal Hong Kong Yacht Club and became their rowing captain for three years. After leaving school he went into business, living in Valparaiso and then working at Jardine, Mathieson and Co.

Military service
Dulley served as a lieutenant commander in the Hong Kong Royal Naval Volunteer Reserve before the Second World War. In 1941 he was ordered to sail a tugboat from Hong Kong to Aden. He was killed by Japanese mortar fire on 19 December 1941 during the Battle of Hong Kong. Dulley is commemorated at Plymouth Naval Memorial.

References

External links
 

1903 births
1941 deaths
Military personnel from Northamptonshire
English male rowers
Olympic rowers of Great Britain
Rowers at the 1924 Summer Olympics
People from Wellingborough
Royal Naval Volunteer Reserve personnel of World War II
British military personnel killed in World War II
Royal Navy officers of World War II
People educated at Westminster School, London
English expatriates in Hong Kong
British expatriates in Chile